Skyon is a 26-story and 95-metre (312 ft) office building in Tallinn, Estonia. Located in the Maakri district and opened in 2021, it serves as the headquarters for Coop Pank. 

The facade of the building consists of 898 triangular and colourful glass panels, between which a total of nearly 4.5 kilometres of LED light strips have been installed.  

In 2022, Skyon was awarded the internationally recognised LEED Platinum certificate.

Tenants 
Skyon is home to several IT, legal and financial firms. While its chief tenant is Coop Pank, it also serves as the headquarters for the real estate investment company Capital Mill, who itself are the developers and owners of the tower. The list of companies operating in Skyon also includes Arco Vara, BaltCap and Eesti Pangaliit.

Gallery

See also 

 List of tallest buildings in Estonia

References

External links 

 Skyon lit up in the colours of the British flag
 Skyon lit up in the colours of the Ukrainian flag

Buildings and structures in Tallinn
Skyscrapers in Estonia
2021 establishments in Estonia